Alexander Kent may refer to:

Alexander James Kent (born 1977), British cartographer and co-author of The Red Atlas
Alexander Kent, pseudonym of British novelist Douglas Reeman (1924–2017)
Alex Kent, former bass guitarist of Say Anything (band)
Alexander Kent, namesake of Kentland, Indiana

See also
 Alexandra of Kent, a member of the British royal family